The Battle of Dhalai was a battle fought between India and Pakistan before the formal start 1971 India-Pakistan War for the liberation of Bangladesh. The battle started after an attack by Indian army on Pakistani border outpost (BOP) in East Pakistan on 28 October and lasted until 3 November 1971. Three infantry battalions belonging to 61 Mountain Brigade, one battalion belonging to East Bengal Regiment  and 7 Rajputana Rifles supported by an artillery sized brigade of Indian army fought against a battalion sized 12 Frontier Force of Pakistan army.

The task to capture Dhalai was initially given to Mukti Bahini. However, Mukti Bahini assault on Pakistani positions in Dhalai was unsuccessful. Later the Indian army took the task of capturing Dhalai. Pakistani troops under the command of Major Javed fought valiantly against the Indian troops. After suffering fair number of casualties as result of fierce resistance put up by Frontier Force, Indian army under the command of Sagat Singh was able to capture Dhalai. Pakistan troops in the area withdrew and Major Javed of Pakistan army was killed in the battle. Brigadier Shiv Yadav, the Brigade commander and Lt. Col. Devasan of 7 Rajputana Rifles of Indian army were also badly injured in this battle. Hamidur Rahman of East Bengal Regiment was also killed in this battle.

Awards
Hamidur Rahman of East Bengal Regiment was posthumously awarded the Bir Sreshtho, Bangladesh's highest award for valor, for his actions during the conflict.

General Sagat Singh was highly impressed by Brigadier Pandey's performance during the battle and he recommended him for Maha Vir Chakra, India's second highest military award.

See also
 Timeline of the Bangladesh Liberation War
 Military plans of the Bangladesh Liberation War
 Mitro Bahini order of battle
 Pakistan Army order of battle, December 1971
 Evolution of Pakistan Eastern Command plan
 1971 Bangladesh genocide
 Operation Searchlight
 India-Pakistan wars and conflicts

References

Battles of the Bangladesh Liberation War